The Biblioteca Nazionale Centrale can refer to:
 Biblioteca Nazionale Centrale Firenze
 Biblioteca Nazionale Centrale Roma